The Movement of Free Citizens, also known by its acronym KEP, was a short-lived, right-of-center political party in Greece. It was a personality-driven party, founded and led by Dimitris Avramopoulos. After resigning from the diplomatic corps in 1993, Avramopoulos began his political career within the conservative New Democracy. First a member of the Hellenic Parliament and then Mayor of Athens, Avramopoulos became one of the most popular Greek politicians.

In 2001, the conservative New Democracy party was suffering from many internal problems, notably the continuous conflict between its president Costas Karamanlis and the former Prime Minister Constantine Mitsotakis, and its opposition to the government of the Panhellenic Socialist Movement (PASOK) seemed ineffective. In this somewhat stagnant situation for the conservative right, Avramopoulos decided to step forward and create a party of his own. His personal appeal drove many new people by his side. However, it was clear that KEP's main asset was Avramopoulos' own charisma, who was attracting most of the publicity. Other famous people involved in KEP were Eliza Vozenberg, a lawyer who served as the party's spokeswoman, and the coroner Mattheos Tsoungas. The first polls targeting the Greek voters revealed that KEP's percentage in an election would be as high as 24%, something extraordinary and unusual for a new party in Greece. In newer polls, though, the party's percentage went on a free fall, and much of the initial enthusiasm quickly faded away.

To his supporters' annoyance and surprise, in 2002, Avramopoulos unexpectedly terminated KEP's existence as a party, pointing at its financial shortcomings as an excuse. He announced that KEP would continue operating as a think tank, and this effectively marked Avramopoulos' return to New Democracy. Few of KEP's members opposed its president's decision and stated that they would continue working towards their political goals inside the party and without Avramopoulos. However, all attempts to revive KEP were unsuccessful. Most of the party's members followed Avramopoulos' return to New Democracy, few of them went to PASOK, while some others have remained politically inactive ever since, overwhelmed by disappointment.

See also
Politics of Greece

2001 establishments in Greece
Political parties established in 2001
Political parties disestablished in 2002
Defunct political parties in Greece
Conservative parties in Greece
Pro-European political parties in Greece